Uffe Krag Pedersen (born 21 March 1954) is a Danish football manager and former player who played as a forward. He works as talent chef for Odense Boldklub and previously managed AC Horsens and Odense Boldklub.

References

External links 
 
 Profile at NASL Jerseys
 Diplomaten Uffe Pedersen

1954 births
Living people
Danish men's footballers
Association football forwards
Denmark youth international footballers
Odense Boldklub players
Vancouver Whitecaps (1974–1984) players
Danish football managers
AC Horsens managers
Odense Boldklub managers
Danish expatriate men's footballers
Danish expatriate sportspeople in Canada
Expatriate soccer players in Canada